The North Main Street Commercial Historic District in Statesboro, Georgia is a historic district that was listed on the National Register of Historic Places in 1989.   It includes eight adjacent contributing buildings on the west side of the first block of North Main Street.  It does not include the property at the corner of West Main and North Main, but rather is the next eight buildings going north from that, to and including the corner of Courtland Street.

The buildings are one- and two-story brick commercial buildings with shared walls.  The two-story ones have pressed-metal cornices.  The main architectural style is Italianate, reflected in round-arched window openings.  No original storefronts are present;  all have been modernized.

Statesboro was the subject of a wider survey of historic resources completed at the same time as the NRHP nomination for the district.

References

External links
 

Historic districts on the National Register of Historic Places in Georgia (U.S. state)
Italianate architecture in Georgia (U.S. state)
Chicago school architecture in Georgia (U.S. state)
Buildings and structures completed in 1900
National Register of Historic Places in Bulloch County, Georgia